Cindy Taylor, known professionally as Jesse Jane, is an American pornographic film actress. She was the Australian Penthouse Pet of the Month for November 2010 and was an exclusive contract performer for Digital Playground between 2002 and 2014. In January 2015, she signed an exclusive, two-year performing contract with Jules Jordan Video. She is a member of the AVN and XRCO Hall of Fame.

Early life
A native of Fort Worth, Texas, Jane graduated from Moore High School in Oklahoma in 1998.

Career
Jane signed an exclusive contract with the adult film production company Digital Playground in 2002. Within months of winning the contract, she appeared on Showtime Network's Family Business, where she was filmed at the Adult Video News awards show and convention. The films in which Digital Playground cast Jane, such as No Limits, Beat the Devil, and Loaded, proved popular enough to warrant her own line of sex toys, as well as secure nominations for several awards. She starred in the Pirates series of erotic films.

In 2006, Jane and Kirsten Price became the hosts of Playboy TV's most popular live show, Night Calls. Jane has also hosted Playboy TV's Naughty Amateur Home Videos and has been the sex columnist for Chéri beginning in January 2007. With fellow Digital Playground contract performers Devon and Teagan Presley, Jane has co-hosted the live, Internet-based adult industry talk show DP Tonight.

Jane has hosted several adult industry award ceremonies throughout her career including the AVN Awards in 2006 and 2013, the F.A.M.E. Awards in 2008, and the XBIZ Awards in 2008 and 2011. In 2007, Jesse also became a sex columnist for the Australian men's magazine Ralph, replying to letters from readers about sex and dating.

In 2007, The New York Times reported that Jane intended to have her breast enhancement surgery re-done for high-definition movies.
She launched a line of signature sex toys circe 2010.
In 2017, Jane announced that she would retire from the adult industry and that that year's AVN Awards would be her last.
In 2019, XBIZ announced that Jane had come out of retirement and shot her first interracial scene for Blacked.com.

Mainstream appearances

In 2004, Jane made a cameo appearance in the film Starsky & Hutch and appeared on the cover of Drowning Pool's album Desensitized.
In 2005, she was featured as UnRated Magazines Vixen, to launch the music review magazine's new edition of Vixens.

Jane was a guest star on the HBO dramedy series Entourage, in the ninth episode of the second season, "I Love You Too", which features the main characters making a trip to Comic-Con, where they get some help from the "Pussy Patrol", led by Jane.
In 2009, she appeared in the reality series The Bad Girls Club.
In a 2009 CNBC documentary titled Porn: Business of Pleasure, Jesse is the focus of the final six-minute segment, which details her career and her life outside the porn industry.

Jane was the Australian Penthouse Pet of the Month in November 2010.
In 2011, she was named by freelance journalist Chris Morris as one of the 12 most popular stars in porn. Morris stated that she is "for many, the face of modern porn", noting her roles in the popular porn Pirates films, and her Performer of the Year nominations by both AVN and the XBIZ Awards. And again in 2014, Jane was on Morris's list of "The Dirty Dozen: Porn's Most Popular Stars".

Personal life
Circa 2000, Jane gave birth to a son. She married her husband Rich Taylor in 2004 or 2005. On March 1, 2012, Jane announced on Twitter that she was getting divorced.

Awards and nominations

{| class="infobox" style="width: 25em; text-align: left; font-size: 90%; vertical-align: middle;"
|+ <span style="font-size: 9pt">List of accolades received by Jesse Jane</span>
|-
| colspan=3 |

|- style="background:#d9e8ff;"
| style="text-align:center;" colspan="3"|
Total number of wins and nominations
|-
|
|
|
|-
| colspan="3" style="text-align:center;" |
"XBIZ Announces Finalist Nominees for 2010 XBIZ Awards" . XBIZ. Retrieved March 13, 2013
|}

Other awards

Selected filmography

Notable pornographic films
 2005: Pirates 2007: Babysitters 2008: Pirates II: Stagnetti's Revenge 2008: Cheerleaders''

References

External links

 
 
 
 
 

Year of birth missing (living people)
21st-century American women
Actresses from Texas
American pornographic film actresses
AVN Award winners
Living people
People from Fort Worth, Texas
Pornographic film actors from Texas